Oliver Cromwell (1599–1658) was an English military and political leader and later Lord Protector of the Commonwealth of England, Scotland and Ireland.

Cromwell may also refer to:

People
Cromwell (name)

Places
 Cromwell, New South Wales, Australia
 Cromwell, Nottinghamshire, England
 Cromwell, New Zealand

United States
 Cromwell, Alabama
 Cromwell, Connecticut
 Cromwell, Indiana
 Cromwell, Iowa
 Cromwell, Kentucky
 Cromwell, Minnesota
 Cromwell, Oklahoma
 Cromwell, Washington
 Cromwell Township, Clay County, Minnesota
 Cromwell Township, Huntingdon County, Pennsylvania

Entertainment
 Cromwell (film), from 1970, starring Richard Harris
 Cromwell (play), by Victor Hugo
 Cromwell (tragedy), an 1820 verse tragedy by Honoré de Balzac

Ships
 USS Cromwell (DE-1014), United States Navy ocean escort ship
 NOAAS Townsend Cromwell (R 443), an American fisheries research ship

Other uses
 Baron Cromwell, a peerage of England
 Cromwell (computing), replacement firmware for the Microsoft Xbox
 Cromwell College, a residential college of the University of Queensland in St Lucia, Queensland, Australia
 Cromwell Current, in the Pacific Ocean
 The Cromwell Las Vegas, a boutique hotel in Las Vegas, Nevada, US
 Cromwell tank, a series of British tanks from World War II

See also

 Oliver Cromwell (disambiguation)
 Cromwellian (disambiguation)